Ryo Sato may refer to:

, Japanese footballer
, Japanese high jumper